CYGB may refer to:

Cytoglobin, the protein product of CYGB, a human and mammalian gene
Texada/Gillies Bay Airport